The 1987-88 Zamalek SC season was Zamalek SC association football club's 78th season in existence. The club competed in the Egyptian Premier League, Egypt Cup, Afro-Asian Club Championship and the African Cup of Champions Clubs. The club were crowned champions of their domestic league, the Egyptian Premier League for the sixth time in their history because of a tie breaker on goal difference against the defending champions, Al Ahly SC. The Egyptian club also won the Egypt Cup, and the Afro-Asian Club Championship this season.

Squad

Egyptian Premier League

League table

Matches

Egypt Cup

Afro-Asian Championship

African Cup of Champions Clubs

First round 

Juvenil Reyes withdrew.

Second round

See also
Football in Egypt
List of football clubs in Egypt

References

Zamalek SC seasons
Zamalek